Stephen Byrne (born 1977) is an Irish retired hurler who played as a goalkeeper for the Offaly senior hurling team. 

Byrne made his first appearance for the team during the 1998 National League and became a regular member of the starting fifteen until he left the panel after the 2003 championship. During that time he won one All-Ireland medal and one All-Star award. Byrne was an All-Ireland runner-up on one occasion.

At club level Byrne played with the Kilcormac–Killoughey club.

In retirement from playing Byrne became involved in team management and coaching. After spending two seasons as manager of the Offaly under-21 team he became a selector under Ollie Baker with the Offaly senior team.

Playing career

Club

At club level Byrne has enjoyed some success with Kilcormac–Killoughey, winning a county intermediate hurling championship medal in 2006.

Inter-county

Byrne first came to prominence on the inter-county scene as a member of the Offaly senior hurling team. He made his debut in a National Hurling League game against Antrim in 1998. Later that year he made his championship debut against Meath before lining out in his first provincial decider. Kilkenny provided the opposition on that occasion, however, a 3-10 to 1-11 defeat was Byrne's lot on that occasion. This defeat prompted the Offaly manager, Babs Keating, to describe the team as "sheep in a heap", and he promptly resigned. It looked as if Offaly's championship hopes were in disarray, however, they overcame Antrim in the All-Ireland quarter-final and qualified to meet Clare in the semi-final. The first game ended in a draw and had to be replayed, however, the replay was ended early because of a time-keeping error by the referee Jimmy Cooney. Following a protest on the pitch of Croke Park by the Offaly supporters it was decided that Clare and Offaly would meet for a third time. Byrne's side won the third game and qualified to play Kilkenny in the final. On that day Brian Whelahan delivered one of his greatest-ever Offaly performances, scoring 1-6. Offaly reversed the Leinster final defeat by winning the All-Ireland final by 2-13 to 1-16. It was Byrne's first All-Ireland medal. He was later honoured with an All-Star award while he was also named Eircell Young Hurler of the Year.

Offaly surrendered their All-Ireland crown the following year but returned to the All-Ireland decider again in 2000 in a repeat of the Leinster final. Kilkenny's D.J. Carey capitalised on an Offaly mistake after just six minutes to start a goal-fest for "the Cats".  Carey scored 2–4 in all, sharing his second goal with Henry Shefflin who also scored a goal in the second-half.  At the full-time whistle Kilkenny were the champions by 5–15 to 1–14.

The next two seasons saw Offaly exit the provincial championship at an early stage. Byrne was dropped as first-choice goalkeeper in 2003 and left the panel after the completion of the championship.

Inter-provincial

Byrne also lined out with Leinster in the inter-provincial series of games. In 1998 he won a Railway Cup medal as Leinster defeated Connacht by 0-16 to 2-9.

Managerial career

In 2009 Byrne was appointed manager of the Offaly under-21 hurling team. He enjoyed little success during his two seasons in charge.

In 2012 Byrne replaced Paudge Mulhaire on Ollie Baker's Offaly senior hurling management team.

Honours

Team
Kilcormac–Killoughey
Offaly Intermediate Hurling Championship (1): 2006

Offaly
All-Ireland Senior Hurling Championship (1): 1998

Leinster
Inter-provincial Championship (1): 1998

Individual
All-Stars Young Hurler of the Year (1): 1998
All-Stars (1): 1998

References 

1977 births
Living people
Kilcormac-Killoughey hurlers
Offaly inter-county hurlers
Leinster inter-provincial hurlers
Hurling goalkeepers
Hurling managers
All-Ireland Senior Hurling Championship winners